St. Teresa's Hospital is a largest nonprofit Roman Catholic hospital in Kowloon, Hong Kong. It is located on 327 Prince Edward Road West.

History
St Paul's Hospital in Causeway Bay had grown out of the caring activities undertaken by the Sisters of the Roman Catholic Christian order St. Paul de Chartres for the poor and underprivileged of the Wan Chai and Happy Valley areas of Hong Kong Island, which commenced in the mid-19th century after the order had first established itself in the then British colony.

To provide geographically closer services for the people of Kowloon on the opposite side of the Victoria Harbour, the Pauline Sisters founded St Teresa's Hospital in 1940. It is sometimes known locally as the "French Hospital", or "Kowloon French Hospital" to distinguish it from St. Paul's Hospital in Hong Kong Island, which is also known colloquially as the "French Hospital". The location of the hospital was next to the demolished Ma Tau Wai, an indigenous village that the modern-day area was named after.

St Teresa's has 1,050 beds and offers a very wide range of specialisations. The hospital is a member of Hong Kong Private Hospitals Association.

St Teresa's Hospital is surveyed and accredited bi-annually by QHA Trent Accreditation of the United Kingdom, a major international healthcare accreditation group.

School of Nursing 
From 1969 to 2002, Saint Teresa's had a School of Nursing for Pupil Nurses (General Nurse). The school reopened in 2005 with a two-year programme, accredited by the Hong Kong Nursing Council, to train Enrolled Nurses on a practical and theoretical level. After completing the training, graduates are eligible for enrollment with the Hong Kong Nursing Council as a general Enrolled Nurse (Licensed practical nurse).

See also 
List of hospitals in Hong Kong
International healthcare accreditation

Footnotes

References

External links

Hospital buildings completed in 1940
Hospitals established in 1940
Hospitals in Kowloon City District
Ma Tau Wai
Medical Services by Catholic community in Hong Kong
Nursing schools in Hong Kong